Muhammad Zainul Majdi (born 31 May 1972) is an Indonesian politician who served as Governor of West Nusa Tenggara between 2008 and 2018. He is also known as Tuan Guru Bajang. He was sworn in by Minister of Home Affairs Mardiyanto on 17 September 2008.

References

1972 births
Living people
Governors of West Nusa Tenggara
People from West Nusa Tenggara
Democratic Party (Indonesia) politicians
Crescent Star Party (Indonesia) politicians
Golkar politicians